Julian of Emesa or Elian al-Homsi (d. 284) was a Christian saint from Emesa (modern Homs, in Syria) martyred for refusing to renounce Christianity at the hands of his own father, a Roman officer. 

The Church of Saint Elian was founded in 432 on the claimed spot of Julian's death, with his remains placed in a sarcophagus in a small chapel to the right of the church's main crypt.

See also 
 Monastery of St. Elian

References

Bibliography 

Syrian Christian saints
People from Homs
284 deaths
2nd-century Christian martyrs